Mangmi Station is a station of Busan Metro Line 3 in Mangmi-dong, Suyeong District, Busan, South Korea.

External links

  Cyber station information from Busan Transportation Corporation

Busan Metro stations
Suyeong District
Railway stations opened in 2005